Saint Helena Sound is a coastal inlet in the Lowcountry region South Carolina, located along the Atlantic Ocean between Beaufort and Colleton counties. Located within the relatively undeveloped ACE Basin, the sound consists of the mouths of the Ashepoo, Combahee, and the south branch of the Edisto rivers, of which the ACE moniker derives from. The inlet is located east of Beaufort, between Edisto Island and Hunting Island. The Intracoastal Waterway crosses the sound. Much of the land surrounding St. Helena Sound has been preserved through the St. Helena Sound Heritage Preserve and the larger ACE Basin project.

See also
 ACE Basin
 St. Helena Sound Heritage Preserve
 Waterways forming and crossings of the Atlantic Intracoastal Waterway
 List of rivers of South Carolina
 List of rivers of the Americas by coastline

References 

Bodies of water of Beaufort County, South Carolina
Bodies of water of Colleton County, South Carolina
Bodies of water of South Carolina
Intracoastal Waterway
Sounds of the United States